James Bowley may refer to:

 James E. Bowley, American professor of religious studies
 James A. Bowley ( 1844–1891), judge, politician, and newspaper publisher from South Carolina